ITM Vocational University is a private university located in Waghodia, Vadodara district, Gujarat, India. The university was established in 2014 by the ITM Group of Institutions through The Gujarat Private Universities (Amendment) Act, 2014.

References

External links

Universities in Gujarat
Educational institutions established in 2014
2014 establishments in Gujarat
Private universities in India
Vadodara district